Sternidius punctatus is a species of flat-faced longhorn in the family of beetles known as Cerambycidae.

References

Further reading

External links

 

Acanthocinini
Beetles described in 1847
Taxa named by Samuel Stehman Haldeman